This is a list of notable literary works involving confidence tricks.

Nineteenth century and earlier
 The Book of Swindles (Du pian xin shu, 1617) - story collection by Zhang Yingyu; China's first collection of stories about fraud, featuring twenty-four categories of swindle, circa late Ming dynasty
 The Government Inspector (1836) – play by Nikolai Gogol; the main character deceives the corrupt officials of a small town into believing that he is a government inspector
 Dead Souls (1836) – novel by Nikolai Gogol; the main character poses as a wealthy landowner so that he can acquire the souls of dead serfs
 The Confidence-Man (1857) – novel by Herman Melville; the main character tests confidence of other people
 Les Misérables (1862) – novel by Victor Hugo; the Thénardiers, two of the primary villains scam money from people
 Adventures of Huckleberry Finn (1884) – novel by Mark Twain; two characters, The Duke and the Dauphin are grifters
 "The Red-Headed League" (1891) – Sherlock Holmes story by Arthur Conan Doyle, which involves a sort of confidence trick used to enable a bank robbery

Twentieth century
 The Miracle Man (1914), play by George M. Cohan, the main characters are con artists.
 Simon Templar (published 1928–1963), also known as "The Saint", a main character in Leslie Charteris' novels and stories who is often involved in scams and cons
 The Twelve Chairs (1928) and The Little Golden Calf (1931) – satirical novels by Ilf and Petrov; the main character, Ostap Bender, is a con man, who has carried out most of the tricks listed below, and The Little Golden Calf contains a fictional secret society of con men called Children of Lieutenant Schmidt
 Farewell, My Lovely (1940) – novel by Raymond Chandler, the villains Marriott and Amthor are con-artists.
 The Space Merchants (1952) – sci-fi novel by Frederik Pohl and Cyril Kornbluth is full of con games practiced by corporations
 Confessions of Felix Krull, Confidence Man: The Early Years (1954) – Thomas Mann's unfinished novel about a German con man
 The Stainless Steel Rat (1961–present) – series of sci-fi novels by Harry Harrison; the protagonist, James Bolivar diGriz ("Slippery Jim"), is a con man and uses abundant schemes and frauds
 Travis McGee (published 1964–1984) – a character in John D. MacDonald's series of detective novels, frequently uses con games or has them tried against him
 Only When I Larf (1968) – comic thriller by Len Deighton describing the activities of a team of three fictional confidence tricksters.
 The Golden Egg (1984) – psychological thriller novel by Tim Krabbé features a chemistry teacher who employs con for the purpose of kidnapping
 Repairman Jack (1984–present) – a character in F. Paul Wilson's series of novels, often runs scams on other con artists
 If Tomorrow Comes (1985) – novel by Sidney Sheldon, which has a con artist as the main character and is mostly based on trickery and deception
 Hellblazer (1988–present) – ongoing horror comic book series; the main character, John Constantine, uses confidence scams, trickery and magick
 The Brethren (2000) – novel by John Grisham features a con run by three incarcerated judges

Twenty-first century
 Matchstick Men (2002) – novel by Eric Garcia; the main characters are con artists
 American Gods (2001) – novel by Neil Gaiman uses a two-man con as a major plot element
 Going Postal (2004) – Terry Pratchett's Discworld novel features a convicted and condemned con artist Moist von Lipwig, who applies the principles of the con in his new job as Postmaster General
 The Lies of Locke Lamora (2006) – fantasy novel by Scott Lynch follows the adventures of a group of con artists known as the Gentlemen Bastards
 The Collectors (2006) – novel by David Baldacci; one of the main characters cons a casino owner out of $40 million
 Mr. Monk in Trouble – mystery novel by Lee Goldberg based on the television series Monk features several subplots set in the 1850s where criminals salt their mines with rather ingenious methods
Six of Crows (2015) – a fantasy novel by Leigh Bardugo; one of the main seeks revenge on the man who once conned him and his brother

See also
 Confidence trick
 Picaresque novel

References

Literature
Literature by topic